The 1993 PBA season was the 19th season of the Philippine Basketball Association (PBA).

Board of governors

Executive committee
 Reynaldo G. Marquez (Commissioner)
 Luis Lorenzo, Sr. (Chairman, representing Pepsi Mega Hotshots)
 Wilfred Steven Uytengsu, representing Alaska Milkmen)
 Nazario L. Avedaño (Treasurer, representing San Miguel Beermen)

Teams

Season highlights
The league moves to its new home, the Cuneta Astrodome in Pasay.
The PBA unveils their new logo during the opening ceremonies on February 28. The logo was chosen from more than 2000 entries in a nationwide contest held on January, following the theme "It's more than just basketball". The winning logo design was created by a professional graphic designer from Manila, Oscar de Castro (www.oscardecastro.ca) who is now based in Winnipeg, Manitoba, Canada.
The league changes their playdates from Tuesdays, Thursdays and Sundays to Tuesdays, Fridays and Sundays. The move of their second weekly playdate from Thursday to Friday is to attract weekend crowds.
Sta. Lucia Realtors made its debut in the league, parading top draft pick Zandro "Jun" Limpot and former players from the Presto franchise led by Vergel Meneses.
Benjie Paras was unable to come in terms with his team Shell Rimula X at the start of the season as he declared that he wanted to be traded to Ginebra San Miguel, he was not able to play in the All-Filipino Conference. A settlement was reached before the start of the Second Conference.
The All-Filipino Cup became the opening conference of the season, Coney Island Ice Cream Stars (formerly Purefoods TJ Hotdogs) defeated the San Miguel Beermen for the title. Coney Island coach Vincent "Chot" Reyes made history as the first coach to claim a PBA crown in his maiden season with the team.
The Second Conference was renamed Commissioner's Cup, corporate rivals Purefoods and Swift Mighty Meaties faced off for the second time in the finals with Swift snagging their second championship behind the exploits of best import Ronnie Thompkins. The said conference was also full of blockbuster trades that saw several players traded to other teams.
The Third Conference was named after the PBA Board of Governors and was called Governor's Cup. The San Miguel Beermen surpassed the defunct Toyota ballclub as the second winningest team, capturing their 10th title by defeating Swift Mighty Meaties, who were led by the returning high-scoring import Tony Harris.
Purefoods forward Alvin Patrimonio won his second Most Valuable Player (MVP) award in three years in a hotly-contested race between him and teammate Jerry Codiñera for the coveted award.

Opening ceremonies
The muses for the participating teams are as follows:

Champions
 All-Filipino Cup: Coney Island Ice Cream Stars
 Commissioner's Cup: Swift Mighty Meaty Hotdogs
 Governors Cup: San Miguel Beermen
 Team with best win–loss percentage: San Miguel Beermen (46–25, .648)
 Best Team of the Year: San Miguel Beermen (4th)

All-Filipino Cup

Elimination round

Quarterfinal round

Playoffs

Third place playoffs 

|}

Finals

|}

Commissioner's Cup

Elimination round

Semifinal round

Third place playoffs 

|}

Finals

|}
Best Import of the Conference: Ronnie Thompkins (Swift)

Governors' Cup

Elimination round

Semifinal round

Third place playoffs 

|}

Finals

|}
Best Import of the Conference: Kenny Travis (San Miguel)

Awards
 Most Valuable Player: Alvin Patrimonio (Purefoods)
 Rookie of the Year: Jun Limpot (Sta. Lucia)
 Sportsmanship Award: Samboy Lim (San Miguel)
 Most Improved Player: Vergel Meneses (Swift)
 Coach of the Year: Chot Reyes (Purefoods)
 Defensive Player of the Year: Alvin Teng (San Miguel)
 Mythical Five:
Alfonso Solis (Swift)
Ato Agustin (San Miguel)
Jerry Codiñera (Purefoods)
Alvin Patrimonio (Purefoods)
Nelson Asaytono (Swift)
 Mythical Second Team:
Allan Caidic (San Miguel)
Samboy Lim (San Miguel)
Jun Limpot (Sta. Lucia)
Vergel Meneses (Swift)
Alvin Teng (San Miguel)
 All Defensive Team:
Jerry Codiñera (Purefoods)
Glenn Capacio (Purefoods)
Alvin Teng (San Miguel)
Arturo dela Cruz (San Miguel)
Jun Limpot (Sta. Lucia)

Awards given by the PBA Press Corps
 Mr. Quality Minutes: Olsen Racela (Purefoods)
 Humanitarian/Citizenship Award: Chito Loyzaga (Ginebra)
 Comeback Player of the Year: Paul Alvarez (Sta. Lucia)
 Mr. Clutch: Alfonso Solis (Swift)
 Role Player of the Year: Glenn Capacio (Purefoods)
 Newsmaker of the Year: Alvin Patrimonio (Purefoods)
 Referee of the Year: Ernesto de Leon

Cumulative standings

References

 
PBA